The 62d Expeditionary Attack Squadron is a provisional United States Air Force unit.  It is a provisional squadron of Air Combat Command, attached to the 432d Air Expeditionary Operations Group, stationed at Creech Air Force Base, Nevada.   The primary mission of the 62d EATKS is to launch and recover all the Air Force Remotely Piloted Aircraft in Afghanistan.

Mission
The unit operates Unmanned Aerial Vehicles over locations in Central Asia as part of the Global War on Terrorism.

History

World War II

Activated as part of IV Fighter Command in early 1943, engaged in Air Defense of the San Francisco area as well as a Replacement Training Unit until the end of 1943. The squadron was trained as a North American P-51 Mustang unit, then dispatched across the Atlantic to join IX Fighter Command in the United Kingdom. It provided air support to Allied ground forces in France and carried out air defence missions, attacking enemy aircraft in air-to-air combat over Europe.

Converted to a tactical reconnaissance squadron in August 1944, engaging in hazardous reconnaissance flights over enemy-controlled territory, gathering intelligence for Allied commanders. Advanced eastward across France using forward combat airfields, then into the Low Countries as well as Occupied Germany until the end of combat in Europe, May 1945.

Postwar era
Remained in Germany as part of the United States Air Forces in Europe occupation forces, returning to MacDill Field, Florida, in December 1945.   Equipped with Douglas FA-26C Invaders for night reconnaissance.  The FA-26 (later RB-26) was an A-26 with all guns removed and cameras installed throughout the aircraft.

Korean War
Due to the pressing needs of Far East Air Forces in Japan the 162d and the photo-processing 363d Reconnaissance Technical Squadron moved from Langley Air Force Base to Itazuke Air Base, Japan on 18 August 1950 for Korean War service and began operations as part of the 543d Tactical Support Group, flying RB-26 Invader night reconnaissance missions.  It later moved to a forward base, Taegu Air Base (K-2) in South Korea on 8 Oct 1950, returning to Komaki Air Base, Japan on 26 January 1951.  The squadron was inactivated on 25 Feb 1951.

Reconnaissance training
Reactivated in 1971 as the 62d Tactical Reconnaissance Squadron, being equipped with McDonnell RF-4C Phantom II reconnaissance aircraft.   Performed replacement training for reconnaissance pilots, 1971-1982 until its parent 363d Tactical Reconnaissance Wing was re-equipped with General Dynamics F-16 Fighting Falcons and became a tactical fighter squadron. Also operated flight of Martin EB-57E Canberras performing electronic jamming mission with RF-4Cs on simulated combat missions.   Retired B-57s in 1976, being the last USAF active-duty squadron to fly the B-57.    moved to Bergstrom Air Force Base, Texas along with RF-4Cs and continued replacement pilot training mission until RF-4Cs were retired in 1989, then inactivated.

Expeditionary operations

Reactivated in 2003 as provisional expeditionary reconnaissance squadron by Air Combat Command, operating UAVs as part of the Global War on Terrorism attached to USAFCENT forces in Central Asia.

Lineage
 Constituted as the 382d Fighter Squadron (Single Engine) on 11 February 1943
 Activated on 1 March 1943
 Redesignated 382d Fighter Squadron, Single Engine on 20 August 1943
 Redesignated 162d Tactical Reconnaissance Squadron on 25 August 1944
 Inactivated on 3 February 1946
 Redesignated 162d Reconnaissance Squadron, Night Photographic on 9 July 1946
 Activated on 29 July 1946
 Redesignated 162d Tactical Reconnaissance Squadron, Night Photographic on 14 June 1948
 Inactivated on 25 February 1951
 Redesignated 62d Tactical Reconnaissance Squadron on 12 May 1971
 Activated on 15 October 1971
 Redesignated 62d Tactical Reconnaissance Training Squadron on 1 July 1982
 Inactivated on 31 December 1989
 Redesignated 62d Expeditionary Reconnaissance Squadron and converted to provisional status on 26 February 2003
 Redesignated 62d Expeditionary Attack Squadron on 16 September 2016

Assignments

 363d Fighter Group (later 363d Tactical Reconnaissance Group), 1 March 1943
 XII Tactical Air Command, 29 September 1944 (attached to Reconnaissance Group (Provisional), XII Tactical Air Command after 16 October 1944)
 Ninth Air Force, 15 Nov 1944 (attached to Reconnaissance Group (Provisional), XII Tactical Air Command)
 XIX Tactical Air Command, 21 April 1945 (attached to 9th Reconnaissance Group (Provisional), 21 April 1945, 10th Photographic Group, 22–25 April 1945)
 10th Photographic Group (later 10th Reconnaissance Group), 25 April 1945
 United States Strategic Air Forces in Europe, 24 June 1945
 Third Air Force, 3 August-3 February 1946
 363d Reconnaissance Group (later 363d Tactical Reconnaissance) Group), 29 July 1946 (attached to Fifth Air Force 18 August-26 September 1950, 543d Tactical Support Group after 26 September 1950)

 543d Tactical Support Group, 10 October 1950 – 25 February 1951
 363d Tactical Reconnaissance Wing (later 363d Tactical Fighter Wing), 15 October 1971 (attached to 10th Tactical Reconnaissance Wing, 5–24 March 1976, 12–26 July 1978, 24 July-24 August 1979, 20 May-22 June 1982)
 67th Tactical Reconnaissance Wing, 1 July 1982 – 31 December 1989
 Air Combat Command to activate or inactivate at any time after 26 February 2003
 451st Air Expeditionary Wing, 26 February 2003 –1 May 2007
 Attached to: 432d Operations Group, 1 May 2007 – present

Stations

 Hamilton Field, California, 1 March 1943
 Santa Rosa Army Air Field, California, 23 August 1943
 Hayward Army Air Field, California, 4 October-2 December 1943
 RAF Keevil (AAF-471), England, 23 December 1943
 RAF Rivenhall (AAF-168), England, 22 January 1944
 RAF Staplehurst (AAF-413), England, 14 April 1944
 Maupertus Airfield (A-15), France, c. 3 July 1944
 Azeville Airfield (A-7), France, 23 August 1944
 Montreuil Airfield (A-38), France, 13 September 1944
 Dijon-Longvic Airfield (Y-9), France, 24 September 1944
 Nancy-Azelot Airport (A-95), France, 2 November 1944
 Haguenau Airfield (Y-39), France, 31 March 1945
 Wiesbaden Airfield (Y-80), Germany, 21 April 1945
 Furth Airfield (R-28) (later AAF Station Fürth), Germany, 26 April 1945
 Reims-Champagne Airfield (A-62), France, c. 24 June – July 1945
 Drew Field, Florida, 3 August 1945

 MacDill Field, Florida, 21 December 1945 – 3 February 1946
 Brooks Field, Texas, 29 July 1946
 Langley Field (later Langley Air Force Base), Virginia, 20 December 1946 – 28 July 1950
 Itazuke Air Base, Japan, 18 August 1950
 Taegu Air Base, South Korea, 8 October 1950
 Komaki Air Base, Japan, 26 January–25 February 1951
 Shaw Air Force Base, South Carolina, 15 October 1971 (deployed to RAF Alconbury, England, 5–24 March 1976, 24 July-24 August 1979, 20 May-22 June 1982; RAF Coltishall, England, 12–26 June 1978
 Bergstrom Air Force Base, Texas, 1 Jul 1982-31 Dec 1989
 Kandahar Airfield, Afghanistan, 2003-2007
 Creech Air Force Base, Nevada, 1 May 2007 – present
 Aircraft operating from Kandahar Airfield, Afghanistan (or other undisclosed locations), 1 May 2007 - present

Aircraft

 Bell P-39 Airacobra, 1943
 North American P-51 Mustang, 1944-1945
 North American F-6 Mustang, 1944-1945, 1946
 Douglas FA-26 Invader (later RB-26), 1946-1951
 McDonnell RF-4C Phantom II, 1971-1989
 Martin EB-57E Canberra, 1971-1976
 General Atomics MQ-1 Predator, 2005– present
 General Atomics MQ-9 Reaper, ?-Present

References

Notes
 Explanatory notes

 Citations

Bibliography 

 
 
 
 

Attack squadrons of the United States Air Force
Air expeditionary squadrons of the United States Air Force